Musoma Airport  is an airport in northern Tanzania serving Musoma and the surrounding Mara Region.

The Musoma non-directional beacon (Ident: MU) is on the field.

Airlines and destinations

See also

 List of airports in Tanzania
 Transport in Tanzania

References

External links
OurAirports - Musoma
OpenStreetMap - Musoma

Airports in Tanzania
Musoma
Buildings and structures in the Mara Region